Boss Lady is an American television sitcom that aired on NBC as a summer replacement for Fireside Theatre from July 1 to September 23, 1952.

Plot
Gwen F. Allen was the chief executive Hillandale Homes, a construction firm. Her father was the chairman of the board.

Production
Boss Lady was a production of Wrather Television Productions, Inc. Jack Wrather and Bob Mann were co-producers. Mann also wrote the scripts, and Bill Russell directed.

Cast
Lynn Bari as Gwen F. Allen
Nicholas Joy as Gwen's father
Glenn Langan as Jeff Standish
Charlie Smith as Chester Allen
Lee Patrick as Aggie
Richard Gainer as Roger

Sponsor and schedule
Procter & Gamble sponsored Boss Lady, which was broadcast 9-9:30 p.m. (Eastern Daylight Time) on Tuesdays.

References

1952 American television series debuts
1952 American television series endings
NBC original programming
1950s American sitcoms
American workplace comedy television series
Black-and-white American television shows
English-language television shows